Capitola Manufacturing Company Cotton Yarn Mill, also known as the Marshall Mill and Power Company, is a historic cotton mill complex located at Marshall, Madison County, North Carolina. The main mill building is a three-story brick building built about 1905. It was raised to three stories in 1928. Also on the property is a contributing boiler house (c. 1905) and water tank (c. 1905).

It was listed on the National Register of Historic Places in 2012.

References

External links

Cotton mills in the United States
Historic American Engineering Record in North Carolina
Industrial buildings and structures on the National Register of Historic Places in North Carolina
Industrial buildings completed in 1905
Buildings and structures in Madison County, North Carolina
National Register of Historic Places in Madison County, North Carolina
1905 establishments in North Carolina